is a train station in the city of Saku, Nagano, Japan, operated by East Japan Railway Company (JR East).

Lines
Namezu Station is served by the Koumi Line and is 66.5 kilometers from the terminus of the line at Kobuchizawa Station.

Station layout
The station consists of one ground-level side platform serving a single bi-directional track.  The platform is short, and can only accommodate trains of two carriages in length, therefore a door cut system is used. The station is unattended.

History
Namezu Station opened on 6 June 1916.  The station was out of operation from 1944 through 1952. With the dissolution and privatization of JNR on April 1, 1987, the station came under the control of the East Japan Railway Company (JR East).

Surrounding area
Nakagomi Middle School

See also
 List of railway stations in Japan

References

External links

 JR East station information 

Railway stations in Nagano Prefecture
Railway stations in Japan opened in 1916
Stations of East Japan Railway Company
Koumi Line
Saku, Nagano